Carbone is an Italian surname meaning coal in Italian. Notable people with the surname include:

Alejandra Carbone (born 1975) Argentinian foil fencer
Angelo Carbone (born 1968), Italian footballer
Benito Carbone (born 1971), Italian retired football player and manager
Fábio Carbone (born 1980), Brazilian race car driver
Francesca Carbone (born 1968), Italian former sprinter
Francesco Carbone (born 1980), Italian footballer
Giovanni Bernardo Carboni or Carbone (1614–1683), Italian painter
Juan Quarterone Carbone (born 1935), Argentine football player and coach
Maria Carbone (1908–2002), Italian operatic soprano
Mariah Carbone, American geophysicist and academic
Paolo Carbone (born 1982), Italian footballer
Paul Carbone (1894–1943), Corsican criminal
Rodolfo Carbone (1928–2008), Brazilian footballer
Victor Carbone (born 1992), Brazilian race car driver

Fictional characters:
Dannii Carbone, a character on the soap opera Hollyoaks
Thorn (Marvel Comics), real name Salvatore "Sal" Carbone

External links
 

Italian-language surnames